Jireh Otto Micky Westerlund is a Samoan athlete who has represented Samoa at the Pacific Mini Games.

Westerlund is from Taufusi and Lalovaea and was educated at St. Joseph's College. In August 2021 he was awarded the Most Valuable Player at the annual Champion of Champions school athletics competition.

At the 2022 Pacific Mini Games in Saipan, Northern Mariana Islands he won bronze in the 110 metres hurdles, 400 metres hurdles, and 4 × 400 metres relay.

References

Living people
People from Tuamasaga
Samoan male hurdlers
Samoan male sprinters
Year of birth missing (living people)